Penance, in comics, may refer to:

Robbie Baldwin, a Marvel Comics superhero also known as Speedball, formerly Penance
Penance (X-Men), a body now known as Hollow, in which female members of the St Croix family have been imprisoned and taken on the name Penance:
Monet St. Croix, better known as M
Nicole and Claudette St. Croix, better known as the M-Twins
Hollow, the Penance body has a personality of its own even without a host and operates independently

See also
Penance (disambiguation)

References